County Hall is a municipal facility in Portlaoise, County Laois, Ireland.

History
Originally meetings of Laois County Council were held in Portlaoise Courthouse. After the courthouse became inadequate, a purpose-built facility was built in May 1982. An extension, linked to the existing County Hall building by a single storey glazed corridor, was completed in 2007.

References

Buildings and structures in County Laois
Port Laoise